is a mountain in Uruma City, Okinawa. The former city of Ishikawa was named after this mountain and the nearby Ishikawa River. There are hiking trails to the summit, although some have become overgrown.

References 

Ishikawa